La Guardia (Italian and Spanish, 'The Guard') or variants may refer to:

Places
La Guardia, Bolivia
La Guardia, Catamarca, Argentina
La Guardia, Spain
La Guardia, Pontevedra, Spain, also known as A Guarda
La Guardia de Jaén, Jaén, Spain
La Guardia, Nueva Esparta, Venezuela
Laguardia, Álava, Spain
Campo de La Guardia, a wine region in Spain
Roc de la Guàrdia (Balenyà), a mountain in Catalonia, Spain

People

de la Guardia
 Alfredo de la Guardia (fl. 1940s), Argentine screenwriter
 Bernardo de la Guardia (1900-1970), Costa Rican fencer
 Ernesto de la Guardia (1904–1983), former president of Panama
 Miguel de La Guardia, Spanish chemist
 Ponç de la Guàrdia (1154–1188), Catalan knight
 Reverter de La Guardia (died 1142 or 1144), Catalan adventurer 
 Ricardo Adolfo de la Guardia Arango (1899–1969), former president of Panama
 Tony de la Guardia (1939–1989), Cuban administrator

La Guardia
 Fiorello La Guardia (1882–1947), American politician, mayor of New York City 1934–1945
 Gemma La Guardia Gluck (1881–1962), American writer, sister of Fiorello La Guardia

Other uses
La Guardia (band), a Spanish pop-rock band
Laguardia (band), American band fronted by Josh Ostrander
Fiorello H. LaGuardia High School, in New York City, U.S.
LaGuardia Airport, airport in New York City named after Fiorello La Guardia
LaGuardia Community College, in Long Island City, New York, U.S.
LaGuardia, a 2019 graphic novel by Nnedi Okorafor

See also

Guard (disambiguation)
Guarda (disambiguation)
Guardia (disambiguation)
Guardian (disambiguation)
 Holy Child of La Guardia, a Spanish Roman Catholic saint